A. A. Pennington (1825–1885) was an American politician. He was a Democratic member of the Arkansas House of Representatives.

References

1885 deaths
Speakers of the Arkansas House of Representatives
Democratic Party members of the Arkansas House of Representatives
1825 births
Place of birth missing
Politicians from Hot Spring County, Arkansas
Arkansas lawyers
19th-century American politicians
19th-century American lawyers